Gallery MOMO is a South African contemporary art gallery, which represents South African and international artists at its exhibition spaces in Johannesburg and Cape Town.

History

Gallery MOMO was founded in Johannesburg in 2002 by the South African art dealer and collector, Monna Mokoena. In 2015, the organization opened a second branch in Cape Town.

Writing in 'Art and the Global Economy', Kai Lossgott identified Gallery MOMO as still in 2017, 'South Africa's only black-owned gallery' and recounted that it had 'paved the way for South Africa's return to the Venice Biennial'. In 2018, Ishani Chetty, writing for the lifestyle and listings magazine 'CapeTown Etc.' ranked Gallery MOMO as one of the city's top five 'must visit' art venues.

Exhibitions
Since its founding, Gallery MOMO has established an extensive programme of showcasing new work in solo and group exhibitions by South African and international artists. According to the Irish Times, by 2006 the Johannesburg venue had already 'earned a reputation for discovering new African and international talent'. Amongst the gallery's earliest events were the 2003 exhibition 'The Age of Enlightenment' by the South African painter, Johannes Phokela. In the 2010s, the gallery continued to host exhibitions by artists such as the South African sculptor, Mary Sibande, the German-based painter, Ransome Stanley and U.S.-born photographer Ayana V. Jackson. The gallery also participates in international art fairs, including the Joburg Art Fair, the Cape Town Art Fair and the Start Art Fair in London.

List of represented artists
Dillon Marsh (b. 1981)
Mary Sibande (b. 1982)
Robert Pruitt (b. 1975)
Jonathan Freemantle (b. 1978)
Andrew Tshabangu (b. 1966) 
Vitshois Mwilambwe Bondo (b. 1981)
Ransome Stanley (b. 1975)
Kimathi Donkor (b. 1965)
Joel Mpah Dooh
Raél Salley

References

External links
Official website for Gallery MOMO

Art museums and galleries in South Africa
Art galleries established in 2002
2002 establishments in South Africa
Contemporary art galleries in Africa
21st-century architecture in South Africa